Danilovo is a rural locality (a village) and the administrative center of Danilovskoye Rural Settlement, Melenkovsky District, Vladimir Oblast, Russia. The population was 55 as of 2010. There are 2 streets.

Geography 
Danilovo is located 19 km northwest of Melenki (the district's administrative centre) by road. Sofronovo is the nearest rural locality.

References 

Rural localities in Melenkovsky District
Melenkovsky Uyezd